Clara Rodríguez, ARCM, DipRCM (Perf), (Born 1970) is a Venezuelan pianist and Professor at the Royal College of Music in London.

Early life and education
Her teachers included Phyllis Sellick, Guiomar Narváez, Niel Immelman, and Paul Badura-Skoda.

Career
Rodríguez is a professor of piano at the Royal College of Music. In 2002 she founded the Ensemble Alma Viva with Latin American musicians living in London.

Rodríguez's repertoire includes both the classical repertoire and contemporary Latin American and Spanish piano. The Venezuelan composer Federico Ruiz dedicated many compositions to her, and she has given world premieres of works by Lawrence Casserley and Michael Rosas Cobian.

Discography 
Pictures of the plains. The piano music of Moisés Moleiro (1904–1979)
Triptico Tropical. The piano music of Federico Ruiz (b.1948)
Piano Works. Teresa Carreño (1853–1917)
Piano Music. Ernesto Lecuona (1895–1963)
Live at the Bolivar Hall

References

External links 
Personal website
Royal College of Music profile

1970 births
Living people
Venezuelan classical pianists
Venezuelan women pianists
Women classical pianists
Musicians from Caracas
21st-century classical pianists
Associates of the Royal College of Music
20th-century women pianists
21st-century women pianists